The seven-colored tanager (Tangara fastuosa) is a vulnerable species of bird in the family Thraupidae. It is endemic to forests in north-eastern Brazil. It resembles the overall greener green-headed tanager; a species confusingly known as the seven-coloured tanager (saíra-sete-cores) in Portuguese.

The seven-colored tanager is a 13.5 cm bird named for the spectacular coloration of its feathers.
 Turquoise-green: Head, chin and mantle
 Black: Lores, area around bill, back, shoulders, and throat
 Bright blue: Breast and edge of tail
 Ultramarine blue: Belly
 Paler turquoise-blue: Wing-coverts
 Dark blue: Edging to wing feathers
 Orange: Edging to tertials, rump and lower back

References

Birds of the Atlantic Forest
Tangara (genus)
Birds described in 1831
Endemic birds of Brazil
Taxonomy articles created by Polbot